Antonio Prío Socarrás  (June 29, 1905 – September 6, 1990) was a Cuban banker and Minister of Housing (1948–1950), and Minister of Finance during the presidency of his  brother Cuban President, Carlos Prío Socarrás.

In 1950, he ran for Mayor of Havana but lost to the incumbent, Nicolás Castellanos. He was married to Rosario Páez (1906–1988) and they had two daughters, Rosario Zoé and Ileana Prío Páez .  He is buried in Woodlawn Park Cemetery and Mausoleum (now Caballero Rivero Woodlawn North Park Cemetery and Mausoleum) in Miami, Florida.

References

 Time magazine - The Bathtub Election, June 12, 1950
 Miami New Times - Dynasty, October 10, 1996
 Libro de Oro de la Sociedad Habanera 1949, (Editorial Lex) 
 Libro de Oro de la Sociedad Habanera 1950, (Editorial Lex) 

Finance ministers of Cuba
1905 births
1990 deaths
Cuban emigrants to the United States